Biuncaria is a genus of moths belonging to the family Tortricidae.

Species
Biuncaria kenteana (Staudinger, 1892)
Biuncaria kerzhneri (Kuznetzov, 1972)

See also
List of Tortricidae genera

References

External links
tortricidae.com

Eucosmini
Tortricidae genera